Jason Gardiner (born 6 November 1971) is an Australian choreographer, singer, and theatre producer best known for his role as a caustic and controversial judge on the ITV shows Dancing on Ice, Born to Shine and Stepping Out.

Gardiner was a judge on the first series of the BBC talent show Strictly Dance Fever. From 2006 to 2011, Gardiner was one of the original judges on the ITV show Dancing on Ice. Gardiner returned to Dancing on Ice for its eighth series in 2013, but the show was cancelled after its ninth series in 2014. He returned as a judge on the show in 2018., before leaving the show for a second time in 2019.

In 2006, Gardiner was one of the judges invited to take part in Torvill and Dean's Dancing on Ice, an Australian version of Dancing on Ice, screened on the Nine Network.

Early life
Adopted at the age of six months, Gardiner was born in Melbourne and grew up in at rural Victoria. He was bullied at school for being homosexual and suffered from anorexia for two years until he came to terms with his sexuality at the age of 16.

At 12, Gardiner wrote and submitted his first musical and was the youngest ever applicant to attend The Workshop in Sydney.

Television

Film
1998 – Cats – Alonzo

Guest appearances
Daily Cooks Challenge – Celebrity judge
The Chase: Celebrity Special (26 October 2013) – Contestant
The Great Sport Relief Bake Off (January 2014) – Contestant
Celebrity Juice (13 March 2014) – Guest
Tipping Point: Lucky Stars (6 August 2014) – Contestant
Let's Do Christmas with Gino & Mel (11 December 2014) – Guest

Theatre

1987 – Cats – Australian Cast – Theatre Royal Sydney
1988 – 42nd Street – Original Australian Cast – Her Majesty's Theatre
1991 – West Side Story – USA National Tour – Dance Captain
1992 – Kizmet – Miami – Jackie Gleeson Theatre USA
1993 – 42nd Street – Dance Captain – Australian National
1994 – My Fair Lady – Dance Captain – Victorian State Opera
1995 – West Side Story – Riff – Princess Theatre, Melbourne
1996 – Dames at Sea – Dick – Ambassador's Theatre London
1997 – Cats – Munkustrap, Rum Tum Tugger, Alonzo and Gus – New London Theatre
1998 – Oklahoma! – Fight Captain – Royal National Theatre London

1999 – Chicago – Aaron – Adelphi Theatre London
2000 – Lady Be Good – Bertie Bassett/Choreographer – La Fenice Opera, Venice, Italy
2002 – Lady Be Good – Bertie Bassett/ Director/Choreographer – Sao Carlos Opera House Lisbon, Portugal
2002 – Anything Goes – Royal National Theatre- Associate Choreographer
2003 – Chicago – Fred Casely – Baalbeck Festival, Lebanon
2004 – Anything Goes – Dance Captain – Theatre Royal Drury Lane
2011 – Aladdin – Abanazar – Venue Cymru, North Wales Qdos Entertainment
2018 – Ruthless! – Arts Theatre
2018 – Aladdin – Abanazar – The Hawth Theatre, Crawley
2022 – Jack and the Beanstalk – Evil's O'Greedy – Queen's Theatre, Barnstaple

Choreography

1989 – Kylie Minogue – Sydney Mardi Gras – Dance Captain
1990 – Ce Ce Peniston – USA Tour – Assistant Choreographer/Dance Captain
1992 – Lalique Show – Hong Kong – Choreographer and Director
1993 – YSL Fashion Show – Hong Kong – Choreographer and Director
1994 – Piaget 120th Anniversary Show – Manila Philippines – Director/Choreographer
1996 – Björk – Smashits Concert – Dancer
1997 – Shirley Bassey – Royal Albert Hall – Choreographer
1998 – Cher – Heaven Concert – Choreographer
2000 – Ultra Nate – Mardi Gras Sydney – Choreographer
2000 – Lady Be Good – La Fenice Opera House, Venice – Director/Choreographer
2001 – Marc Almond – Soft Cell Concert – Choreographer
2001 – Benefit – Edel Records – Choreographer
2002 – Lady Be Good – Sao Carlos Opera House, Lisbon – Director/Choreographer
2002 – Caroline O’Conner – Sydney Opera House – Guest artist

2002 – Victoria Wilson James – Purple in the Park – Choreographer
2002 – Gareth Gates Wembley – Choreographer
2002 – MTV EUROPE – Mondo Show Germany – Director/Choreographer
2003 – London Concert for Peace – Theatre Royal Drury Lane – Producer/Choreographer
2003 – Johnny P – Zurich Gay Pride Concert – Choreographer
2003 – Elton John Premier League Football campaign – BSkyB TVChoreographer
2003 – Persil Trade Show – Leicester Square – Director/Choreographer
2003 – Scuzz TV campaign – SkyTV commercial – Choreographer
2003 – Blue TV – SkyTV commercial – Choreographer
2004 – Premier League/Championship Snooker – BSkyB commercial – Choreographer
2005 – Graham Norton's Celebrity All Stars – BBC One – Choreographer
2005 – Peyton Hed Kandi Gay Pride Concert – London – Producer/Choreographer
2005 – Pregnancy Week Campaign – Discovery Channel – Choreographer

Vocal recordings

42nd Street – Original Australian cast recording
Oklahoma! – Royal National Theatre Production
Chicago – Billy Flynn and Amos, Time Music
La Cage aux Folles – Time Music

A Chorus Line – Paul San Marco, Time Music
Oliver – Time Music
Follies – Old Ben and Young Ben, Time Music
Anything Goes – Royal National Theatre Production, First Night Music

References

External links 
Official Twitter page
 

1971 births
Living people
Australian choreographers
Australian male dancers
Australian male musical theatre actors
Australian male stage actors
Australian television personalities
Australian gay actors
LGBT choreographers
LGBT dancers
Australian LGBT broadcasters
Australian LGBT singers
Gay musicians
Male actors from Melbourne
20th-century Australian LGBT people
21st-century Australian LGBT people